Acalypta elegans is a species in the family Tingidae ("lace bugs"), in the order Hemiptera ("true bugs, cicadas, hoppers, aphids and allies").
The distribution range of Acalypta elegans includes Europe, Northern Asia (excluding China), and North America.

References

Further reading
 Arnett, Ross H. (2000). American Insects: A Handbook of the Insects of America North of Mexico. CRC Press.
 Drake, Carl J., and Florence A. Ruhoff (1965). "Lacebugs of the World: A Catalog (Hemiptera: Tingidae)". United States National Museum Bulletin, no. 243, viii + 634.
 Henry, Thomas J., and Richard C. Froeschner, eds. (1988). Catalog of the Heteroptera, or True Bugs, of Canada and the Continental United States, xix + 958.
 Thomas J. Henry, Richard C. Froeschner. (1988). Catalog of the Heteroptera, True Bugs of Canada and the Continental United States. Brill Academic Publishers.

External links
NCBI Taxonomy Browser, Acalypta elegans

Tingidae
Insects described in 1906